The Christian Academy of Lawrenceburg (CAL) is a nondenominational evangelical Christian private school in Lawrenceburg, Kentucky, United States. It is accredited by the Kentucky Non-Public Schools Commission, Inc. and the Association of Christian Schools International. CAL serves pre-K through 12th grade and has a total enrollment around 150.

History 
The Christian Academy of Lawrenceburg was founded in 1995; it was first founded as a pre-school by the Lawrenceburg United Methodist Church. Today the Academy holds K-12 students at its own facility.

Athletics 
CAL offers many extracurricular activities. Its most popular activity is its athletics program. CAL fields several teams, including varsity cheerleading, boys' varsity and junior varsity baseball, boys' and girls' varsity and junior varsity soccer, boys' and girls' varsity and junior varsity basketball, softball, volleyball, and boys' and girls' varsity and junior varsity golf. CAL is most widely known for its boys' varsity basketball program, which has seen unparalleled success for a school of its size by reaching the state tournament for seven years straight, and the NACA National Tournament in Dayton, Tennessee, five years straight, with one runner-up.

Basketball 

The CAL basketball program began in the fall of 1998. The school at the time had less than 100 students, which made it very difficult for the school to compete in the Kentucky Christian Athletic Association (KCAA). Throughout the years CAL has grown to be a much larger school, but is still small compared to other Christian schools in the state of Kentucky. Despite its humble beginnings, CAL has become a perennial powerhouse in the KCAA and Kentucky Christian School Athletic Association (KCSAA). The small school has produced several college athletes and has reached the state tournament eight out of the last nine years, including an impressive championship win in the 2A state tournament in 2010–2011 season and has earned a birth to the NACA National Tournament six of the last seven years, with another runner-up championship win.

References

External links
 Christian Academy of Lawrenceburg
 Christian Academy of Lawrenceburg KCAA page

Private high schools in Kentucky
Private middle schools in Kentucky
Private elementary schools in Kentucky
Schools in Anderson County, Kentucky
Christian schools in Kentucky
Educational institutions established in 1995
1995 establishments in Kentucky